The women's individual table tennis – Class 8 tournament at the 2016 Summer Paralympics in Rio de Janeiro took place during 8–12 September 2016 at Riocentro Pavilion 3. Classes 6–10 were for athletes with a physical impairment who competed from a standing position; the lower the number, the greater the impact the impairment was on an athlete’s ability to compete.

In the preliminary stage, athletes competed in two groups. Winners and runners-up of each group qualified to the semifinals.

Results

Preliminary round

Group A

8 September 2016

8 September 2016

8 September 2016

8 September 2016

9 September 2016

9 September 2016

Group B

8 September 2016

8 September 2016

9 September 2016

References

WI08
Para